Saddle Peak National Park is a national park in the Andaman and Nicobar Islands in India. It was set up in 1979 on surrounding areas of Saddle Peak.

Climate
The climate here is typically oceanic. June to October is the rainy season.

Fauna
Among the animals found here are Andaman wild pig, Andaman hill myna, Andaman imperial pigeon, water monitor, dolphins, whales and the Saltwater crocodile.

Flora
The Saddle Peak National Park is surrounded by moist, tropical vegetation as well as deciduous evergreen forest. The species Scolopia pusilla and Cleistanthus robustus are found in these Islands that are not found in the mainland India.

References

National parks in the Andaman and Nicobar Islands
North Andaman Island
1979 establishments in the Andaman and Nicobar Islands
Protected areas established in 1979